The Budget Responsibility and National Audit Act 2011 (c. 4) is an Act of the Parliament of the United Kingdom.  It provides a statutory footing for the already-established Office for Budget Responsibility, and requires the treasury to set out its approach to fiscal policy in a Charter for Budget Responsibility.  It also sets out a new structure for the National Audit Office and repeals the Fiscal Responsibility Act 2010.

It was introduced in the House of Lords by the Commercial Secretary to the Treasury Lord Sassoon, on behalf of the Government, and it received Royal Assent on 22 March 2011.

Office for Budget Responsibility 

The Office for Budget Responsibility was initially constituted in shadow form by the Conservative party opposition in December 2009.  It was then formally created by the new government after the general election in May 2010, before being put on a statutory footing by this Act.

The OBR provides independent economic forecasts as background to the preparation of the UK budget.

References

United Kingdom copyright law
Copyright legislation
United Kingdom Acts of Parliament 2011
United Kingdom budgets